Sarah Mei Li Owen (born 11 January 1983)
is a British politician and trade unionist serving as Member of Parliament (MP) for Luton North since 2019. A member of the Labour Party, she has served Shadow Minister for Local Government and Faith since October 2022, having previously served as Shadow Minister for Homelessness, Rough Sleeping and Faith in the same shadow department between December 2021 and October 2022.

Owen is mixed heritage and the first MP of South East Asian ancestry. She states that her "mother's side of the family are Malaysian and a mix of Singaporean and Nonya with Chinese ancestors."

Early life
Owen was born and raised in Hastings. Her mother's family is of Malaysian Chinese ancestry.

Career
Owen worked in the public sector as a care worker for the NHS, a political assistant for Brighton and Hove City Council and a London Fire Brigade employee in the emergency planning department. Owen has been a political adviser to Alan Sugar and has worked on Labour's national small business policy.

In 2011, Owen was chosen as the Labour Party candidate for Hastings and Rye to contest the next general election. At the 2015 general election, Owen finished in second place with 17,890 votes, which was 4,796 votes behind the elected Conservative candidate Amber Rudd.

Owen was formerly a political officer for the trade union GMB and has been a member of Labour's National Executive Committee. She is chair of Chinese for Labour.

In the 2019 general election, Owen was chosen by a panel drawn from Labour's National Executive Committee as the party's candidate for Luton North, rather than by the local membership, causing protests from some of them who felt that GMB had forced the candidate on them. Owen was elected with a vote tally of 23,496, which was a majority of 9,247 votes over the Conservative Party candidate.

On her election, Owen was appointed the Parliamentary Private Secretary to the Shadow Secretary of State for Foreign and Commonwealth Affairs Lisa Nandy.
On 15 October 2020, Owen resigned as her position as PPS to vote against the proposed Covert Human Intelligence Sources (Criminal Conduct) Bill, disagreeing with the Labour Whip to abstain.

On 14 April 2021, Owen announced that she was named Parliamentary Private Secretary to Rachel Reeves and was also appointed a whip.

In December 2021, she was appointed Shadow Minister for Homelessness, Rough Sleeping and Faith. On 28 October 2022, she was appointed Shadow Minister for Local Government, replacing Mike Amesbury who resigned from his post earlier in the year. Her previous portfolio of Faith was retained, and was replaced as Shadow Minister for Homelessness and Rough Sleeping by Paula Barker.

In 2022, she criticised Tory MP Mark Francois for using a "crass racial slur" in the House of Commons, after he had made a speech referring to "Japs".

Electoral performance

Personal life
Owen gave birth to a daughter in February 2020. She has previously experienced miscarriages, a topic she spoke about through her union's newsletter for baby loss awareness.

Notes

References

External links

Living people
UK MPs 2019–present
21st-century British women politicians
British politicians of Chinese descent
British politicians of Malaysian descent
English people of Chinese descent
English trade unionists
Female members of the Parliament of the United Kingdom for English constituencies
Labour Party (UK) MPs for English constituencies
People from Hastings
Women trade unionists
1983 births
21st-century English women
21st-century English people